= Muralles =

Muralles is a surname from Spain, and is also sparingly dispersed over the geographical region of Latin America.

== Geographical distribution ==
As of 2014, the frequency of the surname Muralles was highest in the following countries:

1. Costa Rica (1: 90)
2. Spain (1: 547)
3. Guatemala (1: 113)
4. Belize (1: 133)
5. Argentina (1: 136)
6. Venezuela (1: 170)
7. Peru (1: 181)
8. Chile (1: 201)
9. Colombia (1: 282)
10. Cuba (1: 340)
11. Palau (1: 387)
12. Andorra (1: 461)
13. Bolivia (1: 538)
14. Paraguay (1: 777)
15. Uruguay (1: 1,102)

In the United States, the frequency of Muralles was 1: 1,949. The frequency was higher than the national average in the following states:

1. California (1: 563)
2. New Mexico (1: 619)
3. Connecticut (1: 874)
4. Arizona (1: 1,156)
5. Hawaii (1: 1,222)
6. Florida (1: 1,639)
7. New Jersey (1: 1,019)
